Douglas House may refer to:

People
Doug House (born 1953), Arkansas politician

Buildings

in England
 Douglas House, Petersham, London
 Douglas House, London, a U.S. servicemen's club

in Scotland
An alternative name for Douglas Castle

in the United States

Walter Douglas House, Bisbee, Arizona, listed on the National Register of Historic Places (NRHP)
Lewis Douglas House, Phoenix, Arizona, listed on the NRHP
Douglas House (Vaughn, Arkansas)
J. O. Douglas House, Dunedin, Florida
Smith and Douglas Family Houses, Cassville, Georgia, listed on the NRHP
George B. Douglas House, Cedar Rapids, Iowa
C. F. Douglas House, Norridgewock, Maine
Bennink-Douglas Cottages, Cambridge, Massachusetts
James and Jean Douglas House, Friendship Township, Michigan
Douglas House (Harbor Springs, Michigan)
Douglas House (Lovells Township, Michigan)
Douglas House (Sontag, Mississippi), listed on the NRHP
Douglas House (Florissant, Missouri), listed on the NRHP
Douglas House (Omaha), Nebraska
S. M. Douglas House, Mansfield, Ohio, listed on the NRHP
H. T. Douglas Mansion and Garage, Shawnee, Oklahoma, listed on the NRHP
John S. Douglas House, Uniontown, Pennsylvania
George Douglas House, North Kingstown, Rhode Island
Hugh Bright Douglas House, Fayetteville, Tennessee, listed on the NRHP
Hiram Douglas House, Ooltewah, Tennessee, listed on the NRHP
John B. and Ketura (Kettie) Douglas House, Tyler, Texas, listed on the NRHP

Other
House of Douglas, a collective name for the leading branches of Clan Douglas

See also
Douglass House (disambiguation)